Greenborne is a British radio soap opera set in Greenborne, a fictional rural village. Created by Colin Brake and Andrew Mark Sewell and produced by B7 Media, the first episode of Greenborne was broadcast on 21 March 2021. It is broadcast initially on over 30 community radiostations, such as Swindon 105.5, and Tring Radio.

Synopsis
The series is set in the near future, the summer of 2021, as the residents of the fictional village of Greenborne emerge from the constraints of the COVID-19 pandemic.

Production
Greenborne was devised by Colin Brake and Andrew Mark Sewell and written by Colin Brake, Bev Doyle and Angela Churm. It features an ensemble cast headed by John Altman and Louise Jameson, known from EastEnders and Corrinne Wicks from Doctors and Emmerdale. Altman has described it as "a raunchier version of The Archers". The making of the programme received funding from the Department for Digital, Culture, Media and Sport through the Government's Audio Content Fund. Series One, comprising twelve episodes, each of which has a running time of 15 minutes, was recorded in January and February 2021 with the first episode being released on 21 March 2021 and from then on a weekly basis until 6 June 2021.

Theme music
The theme tune was written by Tim Arnold.

Cast and characters
John Altman as Alan Godwin, a retired Metropolitan policeman, he is the landlord of the village pub, The Fox and Dragon.
Corrinne Wicks as Beverley Godwin, Alan Godwin's younger second wife is the landlady of The Fox and Dragon and was wild in her younger days.
Finley Pile as Lewis Godwin, Alan's son from his first marriage, he is a party animal with a bad reputation and did poorly at school.
Luci Fish as Daisy Godwin, Alan's daughter from his first marriage, she is the opposite of her brother and is studious and intelligent.
Louise Jameson as Evelyn Lejeune, a pillar in the Greenborne community, she is a domineering mother and headteacher of the village school.
Ally Murphy as Elise Lejeune, Evelyn's daughter, she is the chef at The Fox and Dragon and is dominated by her mother.
Pal Aron as Samesh Sharma, an ex-colleague and friend of Alan's from working in the police.
Raj Ghatak as Arjun Sharma, the son of Samesh, he owns the local garage and lost his nurse wife to coronavirus; he has started dating Elise.
Shash Hira as Jeet Sharma, the son of Arjun, he works at the garage and is an aspiring DJ; he occasionally covers at the local radio station.
Bhavnisha Parmar as Piya Chandola, the sister of Arjun's late wife she is a trouble causer particularly to Arjun with whom she was going to have an arranged marriage.
Ali Zayn as Matthew Jefferson, affected by his father's departure, Matthew is a hypochondriac and gets wild ideas.
Amy Rockson as Tanny Jefferson, the wife of Matthew, she runs the local village shop and post office.
Niamh McGrady as Sandra Davis, the owner of the local hairdressers-cum-coffee shop. She is Beverley's best friend and recently came out as a lesbian.
Rebecca Yeo as Chloe Chan, he mysterious baker who seems to upset everyone.
Raad Rawi as Farhad Madani, the sixty-something good-looking Iranian oil painter who lives in the converted old school house but hides a dark side.
Joshua Manning as Logan Cockburn, the manager of the local radio station, Greenborne FM, he is well-known in the village yet no one knows of his past.
Laura Shavin as Rev. Maggie Roberts, the friendly vicar of the local church, who is offended if anyone mentions The Vicar of Dibley.

Episodes

Transmitting radio stations
The following is a list of radio stations that broadcast Greenborne.

Alive Radio
Apple FM
Awaz FM
Awaaz
Bedford Radio
Beyond Radio
Black Country Radio
Bolton FM
BSR FM
Canalside Radio
Cando FM
Carillon Wellbeing Radio
CHBN Radio
Chelmer Radio
Corby Radio
Crescent Radio
Dean Radio
Dover Community Radio
Fuse FM
Future Radio
Hermitage FM
Hope FM
Hospital Radio Plymouth
K107 FM
Kennet Radio
Koast Radio
KTCR FM
Link FM
No Barriers Radio
Oldham Community Radio
Park Radio
Phoenix Radio
Radio Alty
Radio Looe
Radio Tyneside
Radio Winchcombe
River Radio
Riviera FM
Sine FM
SJC Radio
Smart Radio 101
Somer Valley FM
Steel FM
Swindon 105.5
Tameside Radio
TMCR FM
Tring Radio
Vixen 101
Winchester Radio

References

External links

British radio soap operas
2021 radio programme debuts
2021 radio programme endings